Surhali (Urdu: سنگوالہ) is a village in Pakistan, located in Chakwal District of Punjab, Pakistan.

References

Union councils of Chakwal District
Populated places in Chakwal District